Kožený is a Czech surname. Kožená is the female form and Kozeny the German form. Notable people with the surname include:

Josef Kozeny (1889–1967), Austrian physicist
Magdalena Kožená (born 1973), Czech opera singer
Viktor Kožený (born 1963), Czech-born fugitive financier

See also
Kozeny–Carman equation, named after Josef

Czech-language surnames